Nohoval Church is a small Gothic Revival Anglican church located in Nohoval, County Cork, Ireland. It was completed in 1744. Along with Holy Trinity Church, Templebreedy, it is one of two churches constituting Templebreedy Union of Parishes in the Diocese of Cork, Cloyne, and Ross.

History 
Nohoval Church was completed in 1744. It was funded by the Board of First Fruits, first with a IR£450 gift, followed by a £50 loan in 1817. The church was redesigned in 1839 by an unknown architect, and again in 1895 by William Henry Hill.

The Rev'd Isobel Jackson has served as the reverend of Temblebreedy Union of Parishes since 2010.

Architecture 
The church is built in the Gothic Revival style, which is a typical trait of churches funded by the Board of First Fruits. The church features a saddleback roof and a square tower.

References

Notes

Sources 

 

Churches in the Diocese of Cork, Cloyne and Ross